Indivisible was a political radio program hosted in 2017 during the beginnings of Donald Trump's presidency. The show was produced by WNYC Studios, KNOW-FM, and The Economist.

Background 
The radio show featured call-in discussions four nights a week throughout Donald Trump's first one hundred days as President of the United States. Charlie Sykes, the conservative host, would host the show on Wednesday nights. Kai Wright discussed topics that built on the themes established in The United States of Anxiety. Kerri Miller hosts the show on Thursday nights to discuss American identity. Similar shows include Code Switch, Pod Save the World, and Slate Political Gabfest.

References

External links 

Audio podcasts
Political podcasts
2017 podcast debuts
2017 podcast endings
WNYC Studios programs